The uniform and insignia of the Boy Scouts of America (BSA) gives a Scout visibility and creates a level of identity within both the unit and the community. The uniform is used to promote equality while showing individual achievement. While all uniforms are similar in basic design, they do vary in color and detail to identify the different membership divisions of Cub Scouting, Scouts BSA and Venturing. Many people collect BSA insignia such as camporee and jamboree emblems, council shoulder strips and historical badges.

History

Early Boy Scout uniforms were copies of the U.S. Army uniforms of the time. Scouts generally wore knickers with leggings, a button-down choke-collar coat and the campaign hat. Adults wore a Norfolk jacket with knickers or trousers. In 1916, Congress banned civilians from wearing uniforms that were similar in appearance to those of the U.S. armed forces with the exception of the BSA. The uniform was redesigned in 1923—the coat and leggings were dropped and the neckerchief standardized. In the 1930s, shorts replaced knickers and their wear was encouraged by the BSA. The garrison (flat) cap was introduced in 1943. In 1965, the uniform's material was changed from wool and cotton to permanent press cloth, although the older material uniforms continued to be sold and used through the late 1960s. The Improved Scouting Program in 1972 included a major overhaul of badges and other insignia, replacing many two color patches with multicolor versions. Also introduced was a red beret and a dark green shirt for "Leadership Corps" members (ages 14–15) in a Scout troop. This was done to relate those older Boy Scouts to Explorers, which wore the same uniform shirt, but by the early 1980s, the red beret and the Leadership Corps concept had been discarded.   

The Boy Scout uniform during the 1950s–1970s continued to have a monochrome light green (khaki-green) color for both shirts and shorts or trousers.

In 1980, a major change was made when a two-color uniform having a tan shirt with olive green shorts or trousers was introduced. Designed by Oscar de la Renta, it continued to be the uniform until August 2008, when the "Centennial Scout Uniform" was unveiled. The Oscar de la Renta-designed tan buttoned-front uniform shirt had shoulder epaulets and buttoned-down pocket flaps, worn with an olive green webbed belt with a brass buckle or a tan or brown-leather belt. The olive green cap had a bright red front panel and gold fleur-de-lis. In 2006, olive-green "Switchback" zip-off trousers were introduced in place of the traditional trousers, having an integral belt assembly with provisions for either the olive green webbed or brown-leather belt. Socks were olive green with a red band at the top and came in crew or ankle lengths, or knee length for wear with shorts. Female leaders were provided a choice of slacks, shorts, culottes, or a skirt.

Explorers in the 1950s–1970s had a uniform of spruce green shirt and trousers, but by the 1970s many posts were developing their own uniform. Eventually only the shirt was available, leading many to wear the shirt with olive green Boy Scout pants or shorts. When Exploring was moved to Learning for Life in 1998, the new Venturing division used the spruce green shirt with charcoal gray pants.

For most of their history Sea Scouts wore modified US Navy uniforms. Youth wore the enlisted "crackerjack" uniforms, and adults wore officer's uniforms, both of which were usually for more formal occasions. The standard work uniforms during this time were dungarees for youth and officer's khakis for adults. Sea Scouts who had reached the rank of Quartermaster wore the adult uniforms, roughly analogous to a chief petty officer wearing an officer's uniform instead of an enlisted man's. In order to avoid confusion for active duty personnel, modifications were made such as wearing square knot insignia in lieu of ribbons, strips that read "SEA SCOUTS B.S.A.," silver brass instead of gold, and standard BSA insignia such as the WOSM crest, council shoulder patches, US Flag patches, etc. Notably absent from the uniform during this time were Order of the Arrow flaps. Due to being prohibitively expensive and hard to get after 9/11, Navy uniforms were replaced for a new uniform in the early 2010s. 

The uniform had, for some years, been referred to as the "field uniform", but the BSA now uses the terms "official Boy Scout uniform", "official Venturing uniform" and the like. With the introduction of the Switchbacks zip-off pants, the trend is towards a uniform emphasizing comfort and utility.

The official policy of the BSA is that any uniform or uniform part which has ever been approved for use, is still acceptable.  As example, there are some Troops who choose to distinguish themselves by wearing the red berets from the 1970s; or the earlier "garrison" or "flat" hat; or even wear the original army-style uniforms.

General
The uniform and insignia are variously protected by copyright, trademark, and congressional charter. The BSA does allow usage for movies, television shows and other events, but this is done on a case by case basis. The BSA has rebuked instances where it was felt that the uniform was used inappropriately and without permission. BSA rules and regulations also forbid the use of Scouting emblems for commercial or political purposes. Wear of the uniform and insignia is described in the various handbooks, the Insignia Guide and inspection sheets.

Shirts
Official uniform shirts and blouses are of the button-up style with a pointed collar, two front button-flap pockets, and long or short sleeves. Since 2007, all shirts come with a U.S. flag attached to the right shoulder and a BSA program strip above the right pocket.

Shoulder loops
The yellow, tan and dark green shirts have shoulder straps (often referred to as epaulets) and colored shoulder loops (often called tabs) are worn on the straps to indicate the program level. Webelos Scouts wearing tan uniforms and all Cub Scout leaders wear blue loops, Boy Scouts and leaders wear olive green loops (changed from red in 2008), Varsity Scouts and leaders wear blaze (orange) loops, and Venturers and leaders wear emerald green loops. Adults or youth who hold a district, council, or section position wear silver loops; those with area, regional, or national positions wear gold loops. Blue, red, forest green or blaze loops may not be worn on the green Venturing shirt and emerald green loops may not be worn on the tan shirt. Custom loops are not authorized.

Insignia
A wide variety of insignia in the form of cloth patches and metallic pins are worn on the uniform. In general, patches that represent a position of responsibility or an award of merit are referred to as badges and all others are emblems. Other insignia is in the form of medals, ribbons and pins.

Insignia such as merit badge sashes, medals, and pins are generally only worn on formal occasions such as courts of honor, award banquets, or as part of an honor guard.

Flags
Every BSA unit is entitled to a flag, with a specific design for each type of unit. Flags are split with a top half in one color and the bottom in another and the program emblem in the center. The upper half has lettering for the unit type and number and the chartering organization; the bottom has lettering for the community and council. Cub Scout pack flags have a gold top half with blue lettering and blue bottom half with gold lettering. Boy Scouting troop flags are red with white lettering over white with red lettering; Varsity Scouting team flags are orange over white with yellow lettering on both halves. Venturing crew flags are white over gold with green lettering; Sea Scouting ship flags are red over blue with white lettering.

Dens within a Cub Scouting pack have a small flag with the Cub Scouting or Webelos Scouting emblem on blue or the Tiger Cub Scouting emblem on orange and the den number. Patrols within a Boy Scouting troop may create a flag based on the patrol name. The Sea Scout leader flag is red over blue with the Sea Scouting emblem centered and white rating stars: one star for a ship, two stars for a council, three stars for a region and four stars for national.

Local council flags are blue with gold lettering and the Boy Scout emblem; regions have purple flags with silver lettering. The flag of the National Council is purple with a silver emblem and no lettering.

Square knot insignia

Medals and the like are not generally worn on the uniform for everyday use; instead, square knot insignia are worn to represent some national and local Council awards. These insignia pieces are small cloth patches with an embroidered square knot or other emblem that represents the actual award. The colors of the knot, the patch background and the patch border indicates the represented award. For the most part, the colors of the knot emblem are taken from the ribbon or design of the actual award.  The knot is NOT the award, but rather an optional representation and recognition that the individual has received or earned a specific award.

Although they do not use a square knot insignia, the District Award of Merit and the Silver World Award award insignia are still referred to as "square knots". The District Award of Merit and the Professional Training Award do not have a wearable insignia item other than the square knot.

The vast majority of "square knot" insignia represents one instance of an individual's recognition. There are a few awards which may be earned or received multiple times (such as the Scouters' Training Award, adult religious service awards, youth religious awards, etc.) within different program. For instance, a youth member may be able to earn religious emblems as a Cub Scout, WEBELOS Cub Scout, Boy Scout and Venturer or Sea Scout. Small metal pin-on devices may be worn to show the membership division or the level at which an award was presented if earned more than once. The devices are designed to be worn on the medal's ribbon (if the award has a ribbon) as well as on the cloth square knot insignia. For example, the Scouter's Training Award may be awarded as the Cub Scout Leader's Training Award, the Boy Scout Leader's Training Award, the Varsity Scout Leader's Training Award, the Venturing Leader's Training Award, the Sea Scout Leader's Training Award, The Unit Committee Training Award and the Roundtable Staff Training Award; the appropriate device may be worn to show the division in which the award was earned. Multiple devices may be worn if the award was earned at multiple levels.

Adult Eagle Scouts who met additional requirements toward a Palm to the Eagle Scout Award, may wear the highest combination of Palms earned on either the regular Eagle Scout square knot emblem or a special square knot emblem signifying their life membership as a part of the National Eagle Scout Association. This display is to not exceed six Silver Palms and a Gold Palm representing 100 merit badges earned over the 21 required to earn the Eagle Scout rank.

No more than seven devices may be placed on any one square knot emblem.

Boy Scout and Varsity Scout uniform

With the inclusion of girls in the Boy Scout (renamed to Scouts BSA) program, starting February 1, 2019 a new tan uniform shirt has been approved and is available for purchase. The new tan shirt features a red Fleur de lis symbol and red 'BSA' text in place of the 'Boy Scouts of America' text. Also available as an option for boys and girls are new olive green capris uniform pants. The previous official Boy Scout uniform, known as the Centennial Scout Uniform, was named in tribute to the organization's 100th anniversary in 2010. The uniform may be worn by adult leaders, Scouts, and Webelos Scouts. Introduced on August 15, 2008, to have a more outdoors-activity oriented appearance, the Centennial Scout Uniform transitionally replaced the previous version designed by Oscar de la Renta. The BSA declared this uniform "transitional," meaning that those possessing the de la Renta uniform may not only still wear it (as is the case with any previously-authorized uniforms) but that they may interchange parts with the new uniform as well (mainly to solve issues with shirt and pants which were not ready for wide-scale manufacturing at the time).  The uniform "transitional" status ended in 2011.  Except as clearance items however, Council and BSA stores will no longer sell the de la Renta uniform.

There were two versions of the Centennial shirt. The first version was a khaki (officially referred by BSA as tan) button-front shirt with collar, bellowed pockets on the chest and featured a special technology pocket on the left shoulder. This was designed to allow Scouts and Scouters to place their personal cell phone or media player in that pocket. A hole at the bottom of the pocket allowed an earpiece to be to connected to the item.  Many Scouters referred to the pocket as the "cigarette pocket" for its size and lack of real usability. The BSA redesigned the shirt, removing the pocket.

The current version of the Centennial shirt is a khaki (officially referred by BSA as tan) button-front shirt with collar, bellowed pockets on the chest and closed with hook-and-loop closures, and shoulder epaulets with shoulder loops in the color of the individual's registration (see above). All adults and youth males wear forest green or khaki convertible or Switchback zip-off cargo pants, which easily convert to knee-length cargo shorts with the pull of a zipper. Socks, worn with the uniform, are also forest green and have a black "B.S.A." monogrammed at the top and are available in crew and ankle lengths. The new official belt is a forest green rigger style belt with a black metal mechanical claw buckle – other belt styles, mostly in tan or brown leather, are also worn, while the hat, resembling the U.S. Army's baseball-style fatigue hat worn during the Vietnam War-era, is also in forest green with the B.S.A. emblem embroidered in the front in a ghost stitching.

As with the older Oscar de la Renta-designed uniform of 1980–2008, Boy Scout Troops and Varsity Scout Teams vote to select uniform options for the belt, hat, and neckwear. In place of either the new "Centennial" or older "de la Renta" baseball caps, units may choose to wear various headgear options: the iconic campaign hat (colloquially called the "Smokey Bear" hat, which hearkens back to Scouting's inception in 1907), a hat styled like the hat worn by Indiana Jones, a red beret, a garrison (flat) cap, or a baseball-style cap of the unit's own design. The beret and garrison cap are now rarely seen as neither hat has been manufactured for more than 20 years. Neckwear on both uniforms includes the neckerchief and the bolo tie as selected by the unit. A variety of official neckerchiefs are available or the troop can create their own design. Many troops now opt not to wear neckwear. Special neckerchiefs such as Eagle Scout or Wood Badge are generally worn on formal occasions.

Older, all-olive green uniforms from the 1970s and earlier may still be worn by Scouters who possess them, although parts may not be worn interchangeably with the current Centennial Scout Uniform or the de la Renta-designed uniforms. They are prized by Scouting memorabilia collectors from around the country.

Cub Scout uniform
The official Cub Scout uniform is worn by youths in Cub Scouting. The basic Cub Scout uniform consists of a navy blue shirt, navy blue pants, shorts or Switchbacks, navy blue socks with gold tops for Cub Scouts or orange tops for Tiger Cub Scouts, a navy blue web belt with brass buckle with Cub Scout logo, a neckerchief with slide, and a navy blue cap with a colored panel. The shirt has buttons, a pointed collar, two front button-flap pockets, and short or long sleeves. Lion Cub Scouts wear a unique blue T-shirt with large Lion rank image and 'LION' text. The insignia on the cap, neckerchief, neckerchief slide and belt buckle vary by section: Lion, Tiger, Wolf, Bear, and Webelos Scouts. The Cub Scout uniform originally was deliberately designed to emulate the uniform colors and design of the United States Cavalry of the 1800s.

Cub Scouter uniform for females
Female leaders in Cub Scouting have the option of wearing the classic yellow blouse with navy blue pants, shorts, skirt or culottes instead of the Scouts BSA tan uniform. The yellow blouse, though, is less common since it has been discontinued for years.

Venturing uniform

Each Venturing crew votes on the desired uniform; they may use either the official Venturing uniform or may develop their own. Other than emblems, crew developed uniforms may not use elements of other BSA uniforms and must meet other uniform standards, such as not resembling military uniforms. Venturers may not wear the Boy Scout uniform.

The official Venturing uniform consists of the spruce green button-up shirt available only in short sleeves, charcoal gray shorts or trousers, gray socks with Venturing logo and the gray web belt with brass buckle and Venturing logo or the black riggers style belt with Venturing logo.

Original hats were the gray baseball cap or the gray bushman hat with snap-up brim, both with Venturing logos. These were replaced by the Venturing ultra-shield uniform cap in gray with a removable fabric shield.

Venturers may develop a unique crew emblem that, with approval from the Scout executive, may be worn on the right sleeve of the uniform.

A male Venturer who earned rank as a Boy Scout may wear the rank emblem centered on the left pocket. Venturers who earned rank as a Venturer wear this rank emblem centered on the left pocket.

Sea Scout uniform

The Official Sea Scout Uniform is designed to make it easy for members to outfit themselves in a Sea Scout uniform. This universal uniform is worn by all youth and
adult Ship members and serves as both a dress uniform and a work uniform. 
Sea Scout Uniform Components
Navy Blue ball cap, No. 618623; with SEA SCOUTS and the Sea Scout logo embroidered in white.
Dark Navy Blue shirt; similar to Dickies Nos. 1574DN (male) and FS574DN (female), color DN, dark navy.
Dark Navy Blue t-shirt.
Dark Navy Blue pants; similar to Dickies Nos. 874DN (male) and 774DN (female), color DN, dark navy.
Black web belt and buckle with Sea Scout logo, No. 618624.
Black plain-toe shoes and black socks. Or, activity footwear such as boat shoes, hiking boots, or athletic shoes.
Optional Neckerchiefs (unit option)

Youth and Adults may wear No.618625; black triangular design (unit option). The "tar flap" design, No. 618626, is reserved for youth only (unit option).

Scouter dress uniform

The Scouter dress uniform is appropriate for professional Scouters and all Scouting leaders on formal occasions. The current version consists of a dark-blue, two-button blazer with white shirt or blouse and heather gray trousers, slacks or a skirt. The blazer's gold-plated buttons bear the universal emblem and an embroidered Cub Scout, Boy Scout or Venturing emblem is worn on the left pocket or lapel. A black leather belt with gold buckle is to be worn with trousers or slacks. Silk neckties with red, gold, and navy stripes are available for men and women. Black dress shoes and black socks or stockings are worn with the dress uniform. Older versions of neckwear representing Cub Scouting (gold and blue striped necktie), Boy Scouting (silver and red striped necktie), Exploring (blue and red striped necktie), or all programs (silver, red and blue striped necktie) may also be worn with this uniform. A small lapel pin representing an adult recognition may be worn on the left lapel; a small lapel pin representing Wood Badge or the Sea Badge may be worn on the right lapel.  During formal events or recognition ceremonies, up to five pendant-type awards may be suspended from the neck by the individual. The actual Wood Badge is NOT worn with this uniform; a lapel pin may be worn instead.

Wood Badge

During the Wood Badge course Scouters, both staff and participants, wear the uniform of their unit and membership division; this is a change from the older custom where the uniform was worn without insignia other than the council shoulder patch and the Troop 1 numeral. The uniform is worn with the Wood Badge training hat, the neckerchief and with a woggle made during the opening sessions of the course. The hat and neckerchief use the Troop 1 numeral to represent the first troop to use the Wood Badge program. The axe-in-log is the emblem of Gilwell Park where the first Wood Badge course was held and the Maclaren tartan honors William de Bois Maclaren, who donated the funding to purchase Gilwell Park in 1919. After completing Wood Badge, the beads, neckerchief and woggle are presented and worn.

Insignia
Various insignia are worn by Scouts and Scouters representing unit membership, activities, accomplishments, honors and training.

Left sleeve

The council shoulder patch (known as the CSP) is an arc-shaped patch worn at the top of the sleeve that identifies the local council. Below this, Scouts at the unit level wear a unit number and units with veteran status may wear a veteran unit bar above the numbers. Lone Cub Scouts and Lone Scouts wear the Lone Scout emblem in place of the unit numeral. On the new (2008) style official shirt, the badge of office is centered on the pocket, but on the older official uniform shirts, the badge of office is centered and touching the bottom of the unit numeral, or centered 4 inches below the shoulder seam. When earned for the current position, the green lettering Trained leader strip is centered at the top of the pocket flap on the new style official shirt, but on the older official uniform shirts, the red lettering Trained leader strip is centered immediately below and touching the badge of office. Qualified commissioners may wear the Commissioner Arrowhead Honor in the bottom-most position (or if wearing the first version of the Centennial shirt, immediately below the Council Shoulder Strip in the location where a unit number would be worn). Youth who are serving as a Den Chief may wear a Den Chief cord around the left shoulder and under the shoulder strap instead of the emblem. Den Chiefs who earn the Den Chief Service Award may wear the service award cord in addition to the den chief cord, and may continue to wear it for as long as they are a youth.

Right sleeve

Official uniforms come with the US flag sewn to the top of the sleeve. Wearing the flag is optional—Scouts whose religion, tradition, or personal beliefs prevent them from displaying the flag are not required to do so. Below the flag, Cub Scouts (including Webelos) may wear a den number and Boy Scouts and Webelos Scouts (as an option) may wear a patrol emblem. In the next position, Scouts and Scouters may wear the most recent Quality Unit emblem earned by their unit. District or council level Scouters may wear the most recently earned Quality District or Quality Council patch. Venturers may wear the official Venturing emblem or an approved specialty emblem below the flag. Scouts and Scouters at the area or regional level may wear a region emblem below the flag.

Other items that may be worn on the right sleeve include the Musician badge and National Honor Patrol stars. Boy Scouts and Varsity Scouts wearing a long-sleeve shirt may also wear up to six merit badges in two columns of three near the cuff.

Left pocket

The space on the left pocket is reserved to indicate Scout rank. Rank badges that may be worn by Cub Scouts include Bobcat, Tiger, Wolf, and Bear. Webelos Scouts wear the oval rank badge when earned. Scouts in any membership division who have earned the Arrow of Light badge wear it centered below the pocket. Boy Scouts and Varsity Scouts wear their current rank badge centered on the left pocket. Male Venturers may also wear their current Boy Scout rank cloth badge on the official Venturing uniform shirt to age 18.

Scouts and Scouters may wear up to five pin-on medals that they have earned or have been awarded centered just above the pocket seam; medals are usually only worn on formal occasions. Many medals may also be represented by a square knot insignia.

Square knots are rectangular cloth patches that use a multi-colored knot and/or border design to informally represent certain awards. Some emblems use other designs, such as the overhand knot for the District Award of Merit, but they are all referred to as "square knots". Some awards are represented by both medals or badges and square knots; others certificates or plaques and square knots; while other awards or recognitions have a certificate and a small device to wear atop a square knot emblem. Only a few square knots may be worn by youth, among them the Hornaday conservation award, the religious emblem or life-saving awards.

Scouters that have completed the Powder Horn course wear their silver metallic emblem suspended from the left pocket button.

Service stars may be worn above the pocket or top row of square knots. These are star shaped pins with an enameled number representing tenure in each Scouting division. Circular plastic backings represent each membership division: gold is used for Cub Scouting, green is used for Boy Scouting, brown used is for Varsity Scouting, red is used for Venturing and blue indicates adult service. Scouts and leaders with tenure as Tiger Cubs prior to 2000 may wear a service star with an orange backing. Those who served in Exploring prior to 1998 may wear a service star with red backing.

All Scouts and Scouters wear the round World Crest over the left pocket. This emblem is found on the uniform of most other Scouting organizations and represents unity with other Scouts around the world. Beginning with January 1, 2010, the Boy Scout 100th Anniversary ring may be worn on the outside of the World Crest.

Right pocket

The space on the right pocket is reserved for one temporary insignia, such as patches from summer camps or other activities, which should be centered on the pocket. Only one such item is worn centered on the pocket.  Members of the Order of the Arrow may wear lodge insignia on the flap of the right pocket.

Official uniforms have a BSA strip immediately above the right pocket, with the adult uniforms and youth male uniforms displaying the text "Boy Scouts of America", and the youth female uniforms displaying a fleur-de-lis logo and the text "BSA" in larger typeface. There are several insignia that can be placed above the BSA strip, including interpreter strips indicating foreign languages spoken. Boy Scouts over the age of 14 in a Troop's Venture patrol may wear the corresponding strip above the interpreter strip. If worn, a name tag may be placed just above the BSA program strip, interpreter and Venture strips (if worn) or on the flap of the right pocket if no lodge insignia is used. Scouts or Scouters that have participated or have been selected to attend a National or World Jamboree may wear the corresponding patch centered between the right pocket and the shoulder seam. Order of the Arrow members selected to attend the Centennial Order of the Arrow National Conference in 2015 may wear the official Conference emblem in this location as an exception.

Visitors to all such events may wear patches for those events as a temporary insignia, centered on the right pocket.

Female Cub Scout leaders may wear the temporary insignia centered between the BSA strip and the shoulder seam.

Merit badge sash

Boy Scouts and Varsity Scouts may wear the merit badge sash, generally on formal occasions. Merit badges may be worn on the front of the sash and the Varsity Letter with earned pins and bars may be worn on the bottom front corner. Additional merit badges and temporary insignia may be worn on the back of the sash.  The sash is worn over the right shoulder and should never be worn folded through the belt, should not be worn at the same time as the Order of the Arrow sash, and should never be worn buttoned under the shoulder loop strap.

Non-uniform insignia
A number of emblems are awarded that are not intended for wear on the uniform. The emblems for aquatics qualifications such as Boardsailing BSA, Kayaking BSA, Mile Swim BSA, Scuba BSA, and Snorkeling BSA are intended for wear on the left side of swimwear, while certification such as BSA Lifeguard and BSA Aquatics Instructor are worn on the right side. Other awards such as the 50-Miler Award, Historic Trails Award, Paul Bunyan Woodsman and the Totin' Chip and Firem'n Chit emblems are intended as equipment decoration such as a backpack or on a blanket.

Spoof insignia
Non-official patches, badges, emblems, shoulder loops and other insignia are readily available from third-party suppliers. These spoofs are parodies of existing emblems. For example, spoof versions of the "Trained" emblem include Over Trained, Potty Trained and Untrainable. Common spoof interpreter strips include English, Klingon, Brooklyneese and Southern Drawl, and spoof epaulets include a red, white and blue one for Eagle Scouts and a tiger paw for Tiger Cubs. Though not truly spoofs, another very common variant of actual BSA insignia are square knot emblems with spruce green, navy blue, or black backgrounds to match the Venturing and Sea Scout uniforms as opposed to the tan twill used by BSA National, which only matches the Scouts BSA uniform.

Other terminology
Properly, the uniform is referred to as the official field uniform. An activity or utility uniform generally consists of a Scouting related T-shirt, polo shirt or other shirt, often customized with a unit design. Activity or utility uniforms are worn when the official field uniform is not appropriate for activities or as directed by the unit leaders.

Members sometimes casually refer to these classifications as class A and class B, respectively. Such terminology is not used in any official BSA publications, where the terms "official uniform" and "activity uniform" are used.

See also 
Ranks in Scouts BSA

References

External links
 

Boy Scouts of America
Scouting uniform
Boy Scouts